A fan dance is a dance with fans.

Fan dance may also refer to:

Korean fan dance
Vietnamese fan dance
Fan Dance (album), a Sam Phillips album
Fan Dance (exercise), a military exercise
CFA-44 Nosferatu (NATO reporting name "Fandance"), a fictional aircraft in Ace Combat 6: Fires of Liberation